Weekly Shonen Jump was a digital shōnen manga anthology published in North America by Viz Media, and the successor to their monthly print anthology Shonen Jump. It began serialization on January 30, 2012, as Weekly Shonen Jump Alpha (officially stylized as Weekly SHONEN JUMP αlpha or Weekly SHONEN JUMP Alpha), with two free preview issues published in the buildup to its launch. Based on Shueisha's popular Japanese magazine of the same name, Weekly Shonen Jump was an attempt to provide English-speaking readers with easily accessible, affordable, and officially licensed editions of the latest installments of popular Shōnen Jump manga soon after their publication in Japan, as an alternative to popular bootleg scanlation services which were illegal and often poorly translated. It attempts to copy the Japanese magazine.

The anthology launched with a lineup of six titles, with new issues published online two weeks after the equivalent Japanese release. At the time of its cancellation, the magazine featured twelve titles, including installments of monthly series from the Japanese magazine's sister publications, Weekly Young Jump, Jump SQ, V Jump, and Young Jump Web Comics. At New York Comic-Con 2012 it was announced that the magazine would transition to simultaneous publication with Japan beginning with the January 21, 2013, issue, with more new series to be added to the lineup. The magazine was renamed Weekly Shonen Jump starting on January 21, 2013.

Viz Media published its final digital issue of Weekly Shonen Jump and launched the Shonen Jump digital vault on December 10, 2018, providing access to a limited number of free digital chapters and a subscription service to access their back catalogue of Shonen Jump titles. A global version of Shonen Jump+ was also launched on January 28, 2019, called MANGA Plus by Shueisha.

History
In October 2011, Viz confirmed that Weekly Shonen Jump Alpha, a weekly digital version of the magazine, would be released on January 30, 2012. Viz also confirmed that it would release its final Shonen Jump print publication in March of that year after Weekly Shonen Jump Alpha is released.

On January 11, 2012, two free preview issues were published, made available until February 29, 2012. The first, Issue Origins, included the first chapter of each of the six manga to be serialized, while Issue 0 included chapters recently released in Japan, to help readers catch-up.

In Summer 2012, Bakuman became the first title of the original Alpha lineup to finish serialization, and the magazine began featuring installments of ongoing monthly titles from Jump SQ and V Jump, as well as a number of new series fresh from their debut in Weekly Shōnen Jump, including Barrage, Cross Manage, and Takama-Ga-Hara. In October 2012, Viz released the first "Starter Pack," a free, 300+ page preview containing recent chapters of all the titles currently serialized in the magazine.

On January 21, 2013, the magazine was renamed Weekly Shonen Jump and began simultaneous publication with Japanese editions of Weekly Shōnen Jump. The layout and graphic design of the magazine was changed, and a new website was launched at shonenjump.com. The transition also brought with it the announcement of several new series, including a full-color reprinting of Dragon Ball, the superhero webmanga One-Punch Man, and the debut of a new Weekly Shōnen Jump sci-fi series, World Trigger.

On July 4, 2013, the magazine went international, becoming available for purchase in the United Kingdom, Ireland, Australia, New Zealand and South Africa.

In January 2014, Weekly Shonen Jump returned to print via the Jump Pack, a quarterly print sampler that includes a three-month subscription to the digital magazine and a promotional Yu-Gi-Oh! card.

In August 2014, a new "Jump Start" feature was announced, whereby all new series debuting in the Japanese edition of Weekly Shōnen Jump will have at their first three chapters published in the English Weekly Shonen Jump. A variety of factors including continued Japanese serialization and English audience reception will then help to determine if the series is picked up for full serialization in the English magazine.

On June 29, 2016, the magazine expands its availability, becoming available for purchase in India, the Philippines and Singapore.

On December 10, 2018, Viz Media published its final digital issue of Weekly Shonen Jump in favor of new chapters being released for free with an app and a subscription service to access their back catalogue.

Features

Issues of Weekly Shonen Jump ranged from 100 to 393 pages, depending on the titles and special features appearing in any given week, and were available to read online or on web-enabled devices via Viz's official website or through the official app. Readers could sign up for an annual subscription or purchase individual issues.

The format of the magazine generally mirrored that of the equivalent issue of the Japanese magazine, typically featuring the same cover illustrations, as well as color interior pages and the ordering of series on the table of contents by popularity, as determined by weekly reader polls in Japan.

Issues frequently contained additional features such as exclusive creator interviews and manga specials (including one-shots, crossovers, and full-color chapters). Likewise, the official website offered articles, wallpapers, chapter previews, sketch videos, and a variety of other special features. Annual subscribers who registered their mailing address would also periodically receive free promotional Yu-Gi-Oh! cards through the mail, as well as a free "yearbook" each December, which included exclusive one-shot manga specials, posters, interviews, and other features.

Series

Running in the magazine at the time of its cancellation

Completed series

Jump Start series
Beginning in September 2014, the "Jump Start initiative" was started with the goal of previewing the first three issues of all new manga debuting in the Japanese magazine, with the potential for full serialization in the English magazine if various criteria are met.

Specials
One Piece x Toriko: Taste of the Devil Fruit by Eiichiro Oda and Mitsutoshi Shimabukuro - A one-shot crossover between One Piece and Toriko, available for free to annual subscribers who signed up before April 30, 2012.
Naruto, "Movie 6: Road to Naruto the Movie" by Masashi Kishimoto - A special one-shot tie-in for the ninth Naruto film, Road to Ninja: Naruto the Movie, included in the August 6, 2012, issue of Weekly Shonen Jump Alpha.Nura: Rise of the Yokai Clan, "Aoi Spiral Castle: The Final Battle (Act 1)" by Hiroshi Shiibashi - A full-color 64-page chapter published in a free, special issue of Weekly Shonen Jump Alpha on August 27, 2012, to commemorate the Obon holiday.Nura: Rise of the Yokai Clan, "Aoi Spiral Castle: The Final Battle (Act 2)" by Hiroshi Shiibashi - A full-color 63-page chapter published in the October 29, 2012, issue of Weekly Shonen Jump Alpha.Otter No.11 by Tsugumi Ohba and Takeshi Obata - A spin-off one-shot from the series Bakuman, published in the free SJ Alpha Yearbook 2013, mailed out to annual subscribers in December 2012.
Sachie-chan Good!! by Akira Toriyama and Masakazu Katsura - A one-shot manga written by Akira Toriyama and illustrated by Masakazu Katsura, originally published in Jump SQ in 2008. It was published in the free SJ Alpha Yearbook 2013, mailed out to annual subscribers in December 2012.
Hunter × Hunter: Kurapika's Memories by Yoshihiro Togashi - A 63-page one-shot split into two parts detailing Kurapika's origins which acts as a prequel to the Hunter × Hunter: Phantom Rouge film. Part one was included in the December 17, 2012, issue and part two was included in the December 24, 2012, issue.
Nura: Rise of the Yokai Clan, "Aoi Spiral Castle: The Final Battle (Act 3)" by Hiroshi Shiibashi - A full-color 63-page chapter published in the January 14, 2013, issue of Weekly Shonen Jump Alpha.
Kintoki by Akira Toriyama - A one-shot manga originally published in Weekly Shōnen Jump in 2010 as part of the "Top of the Super Legend" project, a series of six one-shot manga by famed Jump artists. It was published in the January 28, 2013, issue of Weekly Shonen Jump.
Naruto: A Digital Retrospective by Masashi Kishimoto - A free digital artbook containing a cover gallery with the artwork for the first 60 volumes of Naruto, a small collection of color spreads, and chapter 624. It was available from May 30 to April 1, 2013. A revised version with more artwork and the original Naruto one-shot pilot was published as a special bonus issue of Weekly Shonen Jump on August 19, 2013, to commemorate the Obon holiday.
Sakuran (Tentative) by Toshiaki Iwashiro - A one-shot manga published day and date with the Japanese Weekly Shōnen Jump on April 1, 2013.
Mario by Masashi Kishimoto - A one-shot manga originally published in Jump SQ 2013 No. 6 on May 2, 2013, and published in Weekly Shonen Jump on May 13, 2013. A four-page prelude to the one-shot was published on April 27, 2013, in the Japanese Weekly Shōnen Jump, and on April 29, 2013, in the North American Weekly Shonen Jump.
Naruto, "Number 638: Ten Tails' Jinchuriki, Obito" by Masashi Kishimoto and One Piece, "Chapter 714: Lucy and Moocy" by Eichiro Oda - Special full-color versions of these two chapters were published exclusively in Japanese in the premium digital edition of Weekly Shōnen Jump No. 33 on July 13, 2013, and in English in the July 15, 2013, issue of Weekly Shonen Jump, to commemorate the 45th anniversary of Weekly Shōnen Jump.Bench by Masashi Kishimoto - A one-shot manga about baseball originally published in Japanese in Weekly Shōnen Jump in 2010 as part of the "Top of the Super Legend" project and in English in the July 29, 2013, issue of Weekly Shonen Jump.
Naruto by Masashi Kishimoto - The original Naruto one-shot pilot, published in a free, special issue of Weekly Shonen Jump on August 19, 2013, to commemorate the Obon holiday.
One Piece, "Strong World" by Eiichiro Oda - A special one-shot tie-in for the 10th One Piece film, Strong World, included in the September 2, 2013, issue of Weekly Shonen Jump.Cross Manage, "Special Bonus Chapter" by KAITO - A special one-shot bonus chapter showing what happened between Sakurai and Misora during their summer training camp, published in the October 21, 2013, issue of Weekly Shonen Jump.One Piece: A Digital Retrospective by Eiichiro Oda - A free digital artbook containing an interview, a cover gallery with the artwork for the first 69 volumes of One Piece, a small collection of color spreads, and the special one-shot chapter "Strong World." It was available from November 21 to 27, 2013.
El Viento Del Norte by Niu Zai (牛 仔 Niú Zǎi) - A one-shot Taiwanese manga about a katana-wielding cowgirl that was entered in the Shonen Jump Manga Competition and was voted most popular by American audiences. It was published in the January 27, 2014, issue of Weekly Shonen Jump.
The Team Before Daybreak by Yu YanShu - A Chinese one-shot about a vampire participating in World War II; it was the most popular entry for the Shonen Jump Manga Competition in both Japan and China, and was printed in the January 27, 2014, issue of each country's respective Shonen Jump.
Dragon Ball Minus: Departure of the Fated Child by Akira Toriyama - A prequel story to both Dragon Ball and Jaco the Galactic Patrolman, originally included in the collected volume of Jaco. Published in the May 7, 2014, issue of Weekly Shonen Jump.
Nisekoi x My Love Story!! by Naoshi Komi and Kazune Kawahara - A crossover two-shot between Nisekoi and Ore Monogatari!!, the first part published in the June 16, 2014, issue of Weekly Shonen Jump and the second part on June 30 issue. Also included in the June 16 issue was the first chapter of Ore Monogatari!!.
Rurouni Kenshin: Master of Flame by Nobuhiro Watsuki - A two-part Rurouni Kenshin side-story about Himura Kenshin's rival, Shishio Makoto. The two parts were published in the July 14, 2014, and September 15, 2014, issues of Weekly Shonen Jump.
Shikigami: Twilight Days by Toshiaki Iwashiro - A one-shot manga by the author of Psyren published in the July 28, 2014, issue of Weekly Shonen Jump.
Astronerd by Kazue Kato - A one-shot manga by the author of Blue Exorcist published in the August 11, 2014, issue of Weekly Shonen Jump.
Tegami Bachi, Chapter 1: "Letter and Letter Bee" by Hiroyuki Asada - Published in a free, special "Tegami Bachi Spotlight" issue on August 18, 2014, to commemorate the Obon Holiday.RKD-EK9 by Nisioisin and Takeshi Obata - A one-shot manga published in the December 29, 2014, bonus issue of Weekly Shonen Jump.
What Can You Kill? by Nisioisin and Akihisa Ikeda - A one-shot manga published on January 12, 2015, bonus issue of Weekly Shonen Jump.
The Right Way to Make Jump! by Takeshi Sakurai - A special manga feature published in the May 4, 2015, bonus issue of Weekly Shonen Jump presenting the series' three-part The Right Way to Make Jump in English! story arc, spanning chapters 27–29, which were originally published in Japanese on Shueisha's Shonen Jump+ platform from April 20 through May 4, 2015.
Naruto: The Path Lit by the Full Moon by Masashi Kishimoto - A one-shot about Mitsuki and Orochimaru, acting as a precursor to the upcoming Boruto: Naruto Next Generations series. Published in the April 25, 2016, issue of Weekly Shonen Jump.

References

External links

 
 Weekly Shonen Jump Alpha at VIZ Manga

Anime and manga magazines
Defunct magazines published in the United States
Magazines established in 2012
Magazines disestablished in 2018
Magazines published in San Francisco
Shōnen manga
Online magazines published in the United States
Viz Media
Weekly magazines published in the United States